= Alhambra Theatre, Durban =

The Alhambra Theatre is a theatre that opened in 1952 in Berea, a neighborhood of Durban, South Africa. It seats 1200 people.

== History ==
The theatre was built by African Consolidated Theatres in 1952 on the former premises of the Alhambra cinema. It first came into use on December 31 of that year. Films were shown there, and plays were also staged.

The Natal performing arts council, Natal Performing Arts Council/NARUK, began to rent the building in 1963 and bought it in 1970 to use for productions of opera, ballet, music concerts, etc. In October 1985, NARUK held its last season of theater there before moving to the Natal Playhouse. The Alhambra has housed the Durban Christian Centre, a neo-Pentecostal church, since 1986.
